Sam Tuitupou (born 1 February 1982) is a New Zealand international rugby union player who plays in England. His position is Inside Centre.

Tuitupou won world titles as captain for New Zealand at under-19 and under-21 level, during his junior career. In his senior career he achieved two Air New Zealand Cup titles, with Auckland and in the Super 14 championship with the Blues. Tuitupou also won acclaim on the international stage with his first All Blacks call-up for the clash with England at Dunedin in 2004. He played for the All Blacks between 2004 and 2006, earning nine caps.

In 2007 he signed a contract with Worcester Warriors, and left New Zealand rugby to join his new team after the completion of the 2007 Air New Zealand Cup. His contract with Worcester kept him at Sixways until June 2010.
Tuitopou moved to Munster for the 2010–11 season, replacing Jean de Villiers as Munster's inside centre. Shortly after gaining his first team place he was banned for three weeks after a spear tackle on Paul Hodgson during Munster's Heineken Cup pool game against London Irish. In his short time at Munster, he became a fan favourite, being awarded the nickname "Hacksaw Sam" by the Munster supporters. On 5 April 2011, Munster rugby announced that he would be leaving Munster at the end of the current season. On 11 April 2011, Sale Sharks announced that Tuitupou had signed for two-years from the 2011–12 English Premiership season. On 25 April 2017, Coventry RFC announced that Tuitupou had signed for two-years from the 2017–18 English National League 1 season.

In July 2019 Sam became an official RFU registered Agent and together with his wife Liz started ProFifteen Player Management 

In November 2020 Sam, alongside Samoan International, Dan Leo created The Red Card Club  a frank and honest Rugby Podcast tackling the more controversial topics in the world of rugby

References

External links
 Sale Sharks Profile at SaleSharks.com
 
 Worcester Warriors Profile at Warriors.co.uk
 Guinness Premiership Profile at GuinnessPremiership.com

Munster Profile

1982 births
New Zealand international rugby union players
Living people
New Zealand sportspeople of Tongan descent
New Zealand rugby union players
Blues (Super Rugby) players
Auckland rugby union players
Worcester Warriors players
New Zealand expatriate rugby union players
Expatriate rugby union players in England
Expatriate rugby union players in Ireland
New Zealand expatriate sportspeople in England
New Zealand expatriate sportspeople in Ireland
Munster Rugby players
Sale Sharks players
Coventry R.F.C. players
People educated at Rutherford College, Auckland
Ponsonby RFC players
Rugby union centres
Rugby union players from Auckland